Dušan Vujačić (10 November 1918 – 19 November 1984) was a Montenegrin athlete. He competed in the men's javelin throw at the 1948 Summer Olympics, representing Yugoslavia.

References

External links
 

1918 births
1984 deaths
Athletes (track and field) at the 1948 Summer Olympics
Montenegrin male javelin throwers
Olympic athletes of Yugoslavia